Kimberly Song Fiorello (née Song; born October 20, 1975) is an American politician who served as a member of the Connecticut House of Representatives from the 149th District, which encompasses parts of Greenwich and Stamford, for the Republican Party from January 6, 2021 to January 4, 2023. 

During her tenure she was often described as extreme and far-right in politics, referred to as Marjorie Taylor Greene of Connecticut, by Sean Goldrick of the Stamford Advocate. Previously, she served on the Representative Town Meeting (RTM) in Greenwich, from 2017 to 2020.

Early life and eduction
Fiorello was born Kimberly Song on October 20, 1975 in Seoul, South Korea, and grew up in Reston, Virginia. Her father worked for the United States Department of Defense, while her mother owned and operated a coffee shop. She is a grandchild of a refugee from North Korea. She initially attended the United States Military Academy in West Point, New York for one year before transferring to Harvard College, were she earned a Bachelor of Arts (AB) in Economics.

Career 
She started her career after college in the analyst training program at Salomon Brothers in New York ultimately becoming a reporter for the Far Eastern Economic Review and the Wall Street Journal in Hong Kong. Fiorello also engaged as a line chef at Wallace Restaurant in New York and several entrepreneurial activities such as becoming a inventor of a storage bag design (U.S. patent holder) and former state director for a non-profit organization in education. She also served as active community volunteer for the Greenwich Historical Society and Grace Church of Greenwich.

Political career
Fiorello first entered state politics when she ran for the 149th District seat. In November 2020, she won the election for the seat. Since taking office, Fiorello, like many other politicians in Fairfield County, has been very vocal in regards to local control over zoning, among other issues.

Fiorello came into controversy in 2021 when speaking on the House floor against legislation making it easier to report instances of sexual misconduct on college campuses. Addressing a section of the bill that allowed amnesty for underaged drinking in cases of sexual assault or rape, which was included to help encourage student-survivors to report their experiences, Fiorello said, “I want to say if you care about your friends, and you see the potential for this kind of violence and harm that can come to your friends, and drinking and doing drugs is related to that, then don’t drink. Don’t do the drugs." Mike Cerulli, former president of the Connecticut Federation of College Democrats, criticized Fiorello, saying her comments “reflect a fairly common narrative" that blames victims — “if they hadn’t been drinking, if they hadn’t dressed a certain way" then they would not have been sexually assaulted.  Fiorello ultimately voted in favor of the bill, which was passed 151-0.

In March 2022, Fiorello came into controversy again after a publicized dispute with a 20-year-old college student testifying in favor of an affordable housing bill. Alan Cavagnaro, a sophomore at Manchester Community College, testified that many people his age are leaving the state because it’s too expensive to live there. Fiorello, opposing the bill, asked Cavagnaro whether he believed housing was a right, to which he stated yes. Fiorello responded that “housing is not a right, because housing is built by other people", and is instead a "want". Later in the legislative session, when debating on whether to make Juneteenth a state holiday, Fiorello, a member of the state's Conservative Caucus, called the Three-fifths Compromise, which counted enslaved Black people as three-fifths of a person, a "compromise in favor towards freedom". Fiorello's comments drew rebuke from Robyn Porter, a Black Representative from New Haven, who pushed back on Fiorello’s comments by responding “the fact that Black people — men, women and children — were not seen as whole human beings for the purposes of taxation and representation, that is what the Three-Fifths Compromise was rooted and grounded in". Fiorello voted in favor of the bill, which was passed 148-1.

In November 2022, Fiorello narrowly lost her re-election bid to Democrat candidate Rachel Khanna.

Electoral history

Personal life 
Fiorello is married to Jonathan "Jon" Fiorello (b. 1976), who is a managing director at KKR. She is currently a resident of Greenwich, and has four children.

References 

Women state legislators in Connecticut
Harvard College alumni
People from Greenwich, Connecticut
United States Military Academy alumni
American women journalists
The Wall Street Journal people
Republican Party members of the Connecticut House of Representatives
Living people
21st-century American women
American politicians of Korean descent
American people of North Korean descent
South Korean emigrants to the United States
American women of Korean descent in politics
1975 births
Asian conservatism in the United States